Perimeceta incrustalis is a moth in the family Crambidae. It was described by Snellen in 1895. It is found on Java and in Australia, where it has been recorded from northern Queensland.

There is a dark brown pattern with white marks on the forewings. The hindwings are uniform pale brown.

References

Moths described in 1895
Hoploscopini